Francesco Michelotti (born 23 October 1969) is an Italian former professional tennis player.

Biography
Born in Parma, Michelotti competed on the professional tour in the early 1990s. 

In 1992 he qualified for the main draw of two ATP Tour events, in Bologna and Florence. At the Florence tournament he lost a close first round match to world number 37 Jordi Arrese, in a third set tiebreak.

Michelotti reached his best singles ranking of 213 in the world in 1993, with his performances that year including reaching the third and final qualifying round for the French Open and US Open.

As a representative of Italy he won three medals at the Summer Universiade during his career, a singles silver and doubles bronze in 1991, then another singles medal in 1995, this time a bronze.

References

External links
 
 

1969 births
Living people
Italian male tennis players
Sportspeople from Parma
Universiade medalists in tennis
Universiade silver medalists for Italy
Universiade bronze medalists for Italy
Medalists at the 1991 Summer Universiade
Medalists at the 1995 Summer Universiade